Gary R. Pfingston (January 2, 1940 – June 23, 2007) was a senior airman in the United States Air Force who served as the 10th Chief Master Sergeant of the Air Force from 1990 to 1994.

Early life
Pfingston was born in Evansville, Indiana, on January 2, 1940. In California, he graduated from Torrance High School in 1958 and attended El Camino College from 1958 through 1961.

Military career
Pfingston entered the United States Air Force in February 1962. He spent his early years as a B-52 Crew Chief at Castle Air Force Base, California from 1962 to 1968 and then worked on B-52s and KC-135s at Plattsburgh Air Force Base, New York from 1968 to 1972. After serving in Thailand at U-Tapao Royal Thai Air Base between 1972 and 1973, he became a military Training Instructor at Lackland Air Force Base in 1973. In 1979 he became Commandant of the Military Training Instructor School. Promoted first sergeant in 1982, he was then between 1984 and 1990 a Senior Enlisted Advisor at George Air Force Base, California; Bergstrom Air Force Base, Texas; and Pacific Air Forces Headquarters, Hickam Air Force Base, Hawaii.

On August 1, 1990, Pfingston was appointed Chief Master Sergeant of the Air Force. Pfingston's focus during his tenure was tackling the Air Force's draw-down and decreasing budget. After Basic Allowance for Subsistence (BAS) issues arose during increased deployments during the Gulf War, he worked to continue BAS for Airmen living in field conditions and toward increasing Servicemen's Group Life Insurance (SGLI) amounts. His toughest challenge was Air Force downsizing. With a goal of avoiding involuntary separations during the ongoing force draw-down, he worked to get the Voluntary Separation Incentive and Special Separation Bonus programs established. He retired on October 25, 1994, and died of cancer on June 23, 2007.

Awards and decorations

References

1940 births
2007 deaths
Chief Master Sergeants of the United States Air Force
Recipients of the Air Force Distinguished Service Medal
Recipients of the Legion of Merit
United States Air Force personnel of the Vietnam War
People from Evansville, Indiana
Recipients of the Meritorious Service Medal (United States)
Torrance High School alumni